Qualification for the 2013 Boston Pizza Cup consisted of both direct and indirect qualification. The defending champion and the highest-ranked team on the Canadian Team Ranking System qualified directly, as do two teams from the Alberta Curling Federation based on their performance on the ̇World Curling Tour.  Eight more teams qualified through qualification events hosted by the constituent associations of the Alberta Curling Federation.

Summary

Qualification events

Peace Curling Association
The Peace Curling Association qualifier was held from January 4 to 6 at the Dawson Creek Curling Club in Dawson Creek, British Columbia. The qualifier was held as a double knockout tournament, with the winners of the tournament qualifying to the provincials. Kurt Balderston and Graham Powell qualified their teams to the provincials.

Results
The draw is listed as follows:

A Event

B Event

Northern Alberta Curling Association
The Northern Alberta Curling Association qualifier was held from January 17 to 20 at the Ottewell Curling Club in Edmonton.

Teams
The teams are listed as follows:

Results

A Event

B Event

C Event

Southern Alberta Curling Association
The Southern Alberta Curling Association qualifier was held from January 18 to 21 at the Brooks Curling Club in Brooks.

Teams

Results
The draw is listed as follows:

A Event

B Event

C Event

References 

Boston Pizza Cup - Qualification